Gordon County is one of the 141 Cadastral divisions of New South Wales.  The Macquarie River is the north-eastern boundary.

Gordon County was named in honour of George Hamilton Gordon, Fourth Earl of Aberdeen (1784-1860).

Parishes within this county
A full list of parishes found within this county; their current LGA and mapping coordinates to the approximate centre of each location is as follows:

References

Counties of New South Wales